Musakhel can refer to:
the Musakhel tribe of Afghanistan and Pakistan
Musakhel District, Afghanistan, part of the province of Khost, Afghanistan
Musakhel, Khost, the administrative centre of the district of the same name in the province of Khost, Afghanistan
Musakhail District, Pakistan, part of the province of Balochistan, Pakistan
Musakhel Bazar, an administrative centre of the district of the same name in the province of Balochistan, Pakistan
Musakhel, Punjab, a village in Mianwali district in the province of Punjab, Pakistan